Melting is the second extended play (EP) by South Korean singer Hyuna. It was released on October 21, 2012, by Cube Entertainment. "Ice Cream" was released as the lead single.

Background and release
On October 9, 2012, it was revealed that Hyuna would return as a solo artist on October 17 with her new single, “Ice Cream“ from her second EP, Melting. On October 13, she postponed the EP release date to make addition to "Ice Cream"'s music video. On October 17, it was reported that the EP track "Very Hot" was banned by television networks KBS and MBC. due to copyright: the song lyrics contained a reference to the brand KakaoTalk. The album was leaked several days on a "foreign music site" before its original release date of October 22, 2012 without permission, prompting Cube Entertainment officially release the album a day earlier than originally planned.

The EP begins with "Don't Fall Apart" (also translated as "Straight Up"), a hip-hop track written and composed by Beatamin and containing marching band elements.  The lead single, "Ice Cream", is a hip-hop and pop track written and composed by Brave Brothers and Elephant Kingdom. Maboos from the hip-hop group Electroboyz also features in the song. The third track, "Unripe Apple", is a collaboration between Hyuna and the main rapper of BTOB, Jung Ilhoon, who contributed as a lyricist. "To My Boyfriend" is a ballad co-written by Hyuna with Son Young-jin and Im Sang-hyuk, also the song's composers. The last track, "Very Hot", was written and composed by Hyuna and best friend, Kim Lee-won. Shinsadong Tiger, the composer of her 2011 hit Bubble Pop!, also participated in the composition of the song.

Promotion and reception
The music video for "Ice Cream" was released on October 22, 2012.  It features a short cameo from Psy. Four days after its release, the music video achieved 10 million YouTube views, tying the record at the time for K-pop music video YouTube views. This exceeded Psy's viewing rate for his viral hit, "Gangnam Style", which took fifteen days to acquire the same number of views.  The video features bubbles, a tattooed man, and ice cream. There was discussion concerning whether or not the video should have a nineteen-plus rating.

Hyuna performed "Ice Cream" and shortened versions of "Don't Fall Apart" and "Unripe Apple" on music shows starting on October 25, 2012, on Mnet's M! Countdown, KBS's Music Bank, MBC's Show! Music Core and SBS's Inkigayo.

Melting went to number 5 on the Gaon Weekly Albums Chart.  "Ice Cream" reached number 6 on Billboard's K-Pop Hot 100 and number 1 on the Gaon Weekly Digital Charts.

Track listing

Charts

Sales

Release history

References

External links
  

Hyuna albums
2012 EPs
Korean-language EPs
Dance-pop EPs
Synth-pop EPs
Cube Entertainment EPs